A total lunar eclipse will take place on Tuesday, June 26, 2029. A dramatic total eclipse lasting 1 hour and 41 minutes 53 seconds will plunge the full Moon into deep darkness, as it passes right through the centre of the Earth's umbral shadow. While the visual effect of a total eclipse is variable, the Moon may be stained a deep orange or red color at maximum eclipse. This will be a great spectacle for everyone who sees it from most of the Americas and western Europe and Africa. The partial eclipse will last for 3 hours and 39 minutes 32 seconds in total.

The moon will pass through the center of the Earth's shadow. Totality will last 101 minutes 53 seconds, the maximum duration for Saros series 130.

With an umbral eclipse magnitude of 1.84362, this is the largest lunar eclipse of the 21st century. Gamma has a value of only 0.01240. Due to the Moon's relatively large size as seen from Earth and greater speed in its elliptical orbit, totality will not last over 106 minutes. This is the darkest and greatest total lunar eclipse in the 21st century.

Visibility
It will be completely visible over South America, seen rising over North America, and setting over Africa and Europe.

Related lunar eclipses

Lunar year series

Metonic series

Saros series

Inex series

Tritos 
 Preceded: Lunar eclipse of July 27, 2018

 Followed: Lunar eclipse of May 26, 2040

Tzolkinex 
 Preceded: Lunar eclipse of May 16, 2022

 Followed: Lunar eclipse of August 7, 2036

Half-Saros cycle
A lunar eclipse will be preceded and followed by solar eclipses by 9 years and 5.5 days (a half saros). This lunar eclipse is related to two annular solar eclipses of Solar Saros 137.

See also
List of lunar eclipses and List of 21st-century lunar eclipses

Notes

External links

2029-06
2029-06
2029-06
2029 in science